Remzifaik Selmani (Macedonian: Ремзифаик Селмани; born 5 May 1997) is a Macedonian professional football player of Albanian descent, currently playing for Partizani Tirana.

Club career
Born in Tetovo, Remzifaik Selmani was playing in Macedonia for the youth team of Renova until the summer in 2014 when he got promoted to the senior team of the club, competing in the Macedonian First League. He performed at Renova for three consecutive seasons and collected 60 caps and 10 goals in the First League, until the summer 2017 when he moved to Hungary, signing for Újpest. Two months later, on 9 September 2017, he also made his debut for his new club by entering the game in the 72nd minute in the league game against Puskás Akadémia.

On 22 January 2019, Selmani was loaned out from KF Shkëndija to KF Llapi in Kosovo for the rest of the season.

International career
He has been a regular member of Macedonian U-19 and U-21 national teams, where he also served as captain in few occasions.

References

External links
 Remzifaik Selmani at KF Lapi's website
 
 

1997 births
Living people
Sportspeople from Tetovo
Albanian footballers from North Macedonia
Association football forwards
Macedonian footballers
North Macedonia under-21 international footballers
North Macedonia youth international footballers
FK Renova players
Újpest FC players
KF Shkëndija players
KF Llapi players
Macedonian First Football League players
Nemzeti Bajnokság I players
Football Superleague of Kosovo players
Macedonian expatriate footballers
Macedonian expatriate sportspeople in Hungary
Expatriate footballers in Hungary
Macedonian expatriate sportspeople in Kosovo
Expatriate footballers in Kosovo